Saint-Genest-Lerpt is a commune in the Loire department in central France.

Population

Twin towns
Saint-Genest-Lerpt is twinned with Palau, Sardinia, Italy, since 2005.

See also
Communes of the Loire department

References

Communes of Loire (department)